Arles-sur-Tech (literally Arles on Tech) is a commune in the Pyrénées-Orientales department in southern France.

Geography

Location 
Arles-sur-Tech is located in the canton of Le Canigou and in the arrondissement of Céret.

This small town is surrounded by the eastern Pyrenees which dominate the skyline around Arles-sur-Tech. The town sits on the only main road which passes through the valley, the D 115, making it accessible from Spain in the west and the plane of Roussillon and Perpignan in the east. It is located close to the larger and more well-known spa town of Amélie-les-Bains-Palalda.

History
At the end of the Spanish Civil War Arles-sur-Tech was the site of a camp housing Republican escapees from Spain. It was used as an initial sorting camp.

Government and politics

Mayors

International relations 
Arles-sur-Tech is twinned with:
 Cubelles, Spain

Population

Sites of interest 
 Abbey of Saint Mary : Arles-sur-Tech is best known for its abbey, which allegedly holds the relics of Saints Abdon and Sennen in a sarcophagus called Sainte Tombe, traditionally believed to have been brought from Rome by Abbot Arnulf in the middle of the tenth century. Its waters are traditionally believed to hold miraculous healing properties.
 The Caixa de Rotllan, a dolmen.
 Saint-Stephen church
 Saint-Saviour church
 Saint-Peter church
 Holy Cross church
 The Fou canyon, said to be the world's narrowest.

Bibliography 
Abbé Adolphe Crastre, Histoire du martyre des saints Abdon et Sennen, de leurs reliques, de leurs miracles, de leur culte et de l'eau miraculeuse du sarcophage (Amélie-les-Bains, 1932). Facsimile reprint, Nîmes: Les Éditions Lacour-Ollé, 2005.

See also 
 Communes of the Pyrénées-Orientales department

References

External links 

 Official site

Communes of Pyrénées-Orientales